Scleria vogelii is a plant in the sedge family Cyperaceae. It grows as a stout perennial.

Distribution and habitat
Scleria vogelii grows naturally from western to central Africa. Its habitat is savanna and swampy forests.

References

vogelii
Flora of West Tropical Africa
Flora of West-Central Tropical Africa